Demons & Wizards is the self-titled debut album of the power metal supergroup Demons & Wizards (a side-project of Hansi Kürsch of Blind Guardian and Jon Schaffer of Iced Earth), released in February 2000. The album was recorded with the help of Jim Morris, who plays lead guitar on almost all tracks, and by Mark Prator on drums.

Track listing

Standard issue
Distributed in Europe and North America by SPV and in Japan by Victor Entertainment.

Argentinian release
Distributed in Argentina by NEMS Enterprises.

Lyrical content

 "Heaven Denies" is based on Milton's Paradise Lost, about the downfall of Lucifer.
 "Poor Man's Crusade" is about the Crusades in a mocking tone, in particular the popular crusades and the Crusade of the Poor.
 "Fiddler on the Green" is about two car accidents which Kürsch witnessed.
 "Winter of Souls" is about King Arthur and Mordred.
 "Blood on My Hands" is based on Wagner's version of Siegfried's story, as told in the Ring cycle.
 "The Whistler" is based on the legend of the Pied Piper of Hamelin.

Personnel
Demons & Wizards
 Hansi Kürsch - vocals and lyrics
 Jon Schaffer - lead and rhythm guitar, bass, music composition

Guest musicians
 Jim Morris - additional lead guitars
 Mark Prator - drums

References

External links
Demons & Wizards' official website
NEMS Enterprises
SPV
Victor Entertainment

2000 debut albums
Demons and Wizards (band) albums
SPV/Steamhammer albums
Albums recorded at Morrisound Recording
Albums with cover art by Travis Smith (artist)